Sharad Bansode (b 14 April 1967 Chapalgaon, Solapur district, Maharashtra) is an Indian politician from the Solapur district in Maharashtra state of India. He contested the 2009 Lok Sabha elections on the BJP ticket from Solapur.

He won the 2014 Lok sabha elections from Solapur (Lok Sabha constituency) as BJP /NDA candidate by around 1,50,000 votes and defeated sitting MP and Union Home Minister Sushil Kumar Shinde by getting 51,7879 votes against 36,8205.

Positions held
 May, 2014 : Elected to 16th Lok Sabha
 1 Sep. 2014 onwards : Member, Standing Committee on Personnel, Public Grievances, Law and Justice

References

People from Solapur district
1967 births
Marathi politicians
Bharatiya Janata Party politicians from Maharashtra
Lok Sabha members from Maharashtra
Living people
India MPs 2014–2019